"The Star Spangled Banner" is a charity single recorded by American singer Whitney Houston to raise funds for soldiers and families of those involved in the Persian Gulf War. Written by Francis Scott Key and John Stafford Smith, "The Star-Spangled Banner" is the national anthem of the United States. The musical arrangement for Houston's rendition was by conductor John Clayton. The recording was produced by music coordinator Rickey Minor, along with Houston herself.  The recording was included in the 2014 CD/DVD release, Whitney Houston Live: Her Greatest Performances and the US edition of the 2000 release, Whitney: The Greatest Hits.

Traditionally performed at sports games in the US, "The Star Spangled Banner" was performed by Houston at the original Tampa Stadium for Super Bowl XXV in 1991. Although Houston was singing live, she was singing into a dead microphone, and television viewers were hearing a non-live pre-recorded version of the anthem due to her musical director making her aware of the risks of performing live including the sound of the crowd, jets flying overhead and other such distractions from pregame activities.

After the September 11, 2001 attacks, Arista Records re-released Houston's "The Star Spangled Banner". She once again donated her share of the royalties, as did Arista Records, towards the firefighters and victims of the terrorist attacks. This time the single peaked at #6 on the US Billboard Hot 100, and was certified platinum by the RIAA. This made Houston the first musical act to take the national anthem Top 10 in the US, and have it certified platinum. The 2001 re-release of the single was Houston's last Top Ten hit on the US Hot 100 during her lifetime. Houston donated her portion of the proceeds.

The Super Bowl XXV performance 

On January 27, 1991—ten days into the Persian Gulf War—Whitney Houston took the field at Tampa Stadium and performed "The Star Spangled Banner", backed by the Florida Orchestra along with music director Jahja Ling, before 73,813 fans, 115 million viewers in the United States and a worldwide television audience of 750 million. The pregame program including Houston's performance of the national anthem was produced by Bob Best for the National Football League and televised live on American Broadcasting Company (ABC) in the United States. Because of the Gulf War situation, this marked the first time the Super Bowl would be telecast in most countries around the world. Outside of North America and the United Kingdom, the Super Bowl was broadcast for the first time in such countries as Australia, Russia, and most other countries. Houston's performance was later used as a music video of the song.

Release and donation 
The patriotic feeling of Houston's stirring cover resonated strongly with the public. Due to overwhelming response to her rendition, Arista Records announced that it was released as a single and video of her performance, and all profits would be donated to a charity connected with the war effort, to be selected by Houston at a later date. Afterward Houston said that "I went back up in the sky booth and watched the game. It wasn't until a day or two later that I realized the whole country was in an uproar." According to Clive Davis, Arista Records' decision to release the record came after three days of being flooded with phone calls from all over the country from people asking to buy copies of the single. Hundreds of radio stations around the country aired the song from tapes they had recorded from the TV broadcast. Eventually, the CDs, records and audio cassettes of the performance were released on February 12, and its video singles on February 17, 1991 in the United States by Arista Records, respectively. And the proceeds―$531,650, a combined contribution from the Whitney Houston Foundation for Children, Inc., Arista and Bertelsmann Music Group Distribution which donated all their royalties and profits from the sale of those―went to the American Red Cross Gulf Crisis Fund, which provided aid to US military personnel, their families and war victims in the region. Houston was named to the American Red Cross Board of Governors. The audio single was also released in some countries including the Netherlands but its shipments were very small.

On May 16, 2000, the song and its video were released on CD, VHS and DVD of her Whitney: The Greatest Hits. The song was only included in the domestic version of the album.

According to Arista, Houston, who had been in the process of picking songs for the upcoming album with then Arista CEO L.A. Reid before the September 11 attacks, shortly after the attack, decided to do her part to help the country recover by agreeing to have her 1991 rendition of "The Star Spangled Banner" re-released. Therefore, it was reissued as a commercial CD single on September 26, 2001 by Arista Records, with proceeds going to the New York Firefighters 9/11 Disaster Relief Fund and the New York Fraternal Order of Police; the single also included her version of "America the Beautiful." With releasing of the single, Reid said that "In a time of tragedy, Whitney Houston's recording of our National Anthem has comforted and inspired our nation."

Critical reception 
Houston's rendition of "The Star Spangled Banner" has garnered unanimous acclaim since her performance and has been cited as a benchmark for the performances of its kind. Hubert Mizell of St. Petersburg Times lauded her to the skies, saying "Whitney Houston brought down the house as the lady with the super pipes sang the Super Bowl's most meaningful national anthem ever." Liz Smith from Newsday called the performance "[a] magnificent rendition," commenting "Her [Houston's] powerhouse version [...] turned that often impossible-to-sing tune into a hit." Entertainment Weeklys Jess Cagle noted the specific circumstances, particularly a patriotic mood at the time, rather than the performance itself, stating that "Her [Houston's] timing couldn't be better: patriotism, thanks to the Iraqi war, is high, and Francis Scott Key's 1814 ode to the flag is about to celebrate its 60th anniversary as our national anthem. The Gulf war fervor has turned Houston's performance into an unlikely, overnight pop hit." Jon Pareles of The New York Times said that Houston's rendition represented the image which the war was recast as "sexy and exhilarating" in the 1990s, becoming a counterpart to Jimi Hendrix's at Woodstock in 1969. He was critical of the media which used Houston's performance as a means of allowing the public to forget the violence of war, and the public's unquestioning acceptance of that, stating "'The Star-Spangled Banner' memorializes 'bombs bursting in air,' and the quiver in Ms. Houston's voice finds seductiveness in the rockets' red glare. But so far, despite the gleaming high-tech weapons paraded on the nightly news, the pop public hasn't joined her. For the moment, it is keeping its distance and hoping the worst will be over soon."

Deborah Wilker of South Florida Sun-Sentinel commented that Houston's version was a "moving rendition" and "imaginative arrangement" of the national anthem, adding "The rare moment on the football field showed her to be much more than a hit machine." Jim Farber, a music critic of New York Daily News, in his review of Houston's 2000 album Whitney: The Greatest Hits, said the song was "bold enough to launch a thousand ships." Sportswriter Dave Anderson of The New York Times commented that "When Whitney Houston belted out the national anthem with the nation at war, she reminded everybody that there was a much more important world out there beyond the Super Bowl, a much more important world beyond even the Giants' hold-your-breath triumph when Bills kicker Scott Norwood's 47-yard field goal try sailed wide right." Los Angeles Timess J.A. Adande, a sports columnist, commented that "It dripped red, white and blue," placing Houston's Super Bowl performance at number three on his list for the best renditions of "The Star-Spangled Banner." In February 2003, Vibe, in a feature article in honor of Super Bowl XXXVII, wrote that Houston's performance was "sweet, sweaty and sensational," choosing it as "Most Kleenex-Worthy Performance." In 2005, Orlando Sentinels Emily Badger, in her articles of the national anthem, picked Houston's rendition of the song as the first of the three good performances along with Marvin Gaye's at the 1983 NBA All-Star Game, and Natalie Gilbert and Maurice Cheeks's in 2003 NBA playoffs, saying a word of praise: "Whitney Houston [...] was so good it sold successfully as a single." Janet Mock of People magazine extolled her performance that "Houston gave one of the most iconic interpretations of the National Anthem in history." Writing for MTV.com in February 2009, Gil Kaufman said the song is a "legendary take on the National Anthem." Luchina Fisher and Sheila Marikar of ABC News, in their articles of lip-syncing, wrote that "Houston's unforgettable rendition of the anthem [...] set the standard that most singers have tried to top." Jenny Mayo of The Washington Times, in her review of Houston's 2009 album I Look to You, praised the rendition highly: "Miss Houston is an artist who can—or at least used to—make songs untouchable. 'The Star Spangled Banner' will never be the same." Bill Lamb from About.com expressed that "[Houston's] formidable power made her Super Bowl XXV 'Star Spangled Banner' performance a legendary moment," and on her biography by Lamb, also described it "as one of the most stunning televised performances ever." Monica Herrera of Billboard called Houston's performance an "epic take", adding "[Houston] made it memorable."

Rushelle O'Shea of Yahoo! Sports called it "the most beautiful and most moving to have ever been performed at a sporting event" and recalled then "Leaving the crowd with tears in their eyes, she moved the hearts of many and received a well-earned standing ovation for this beautiful performance," choosing the performance as one of 'The Top 10 Greatest Sports Songs of All Time'. While commenting on Christina Aguilera's performance of the national anthem at Super Bowl XLV, The Christian Science Monitors Peter Grier drew comparisons between Houston's version and Aguilera's, writing "One thing is sure: She [Aguilera] was no Whitney Houston. Remember Ms. Houston’s performance of 'The Star-Spangled Banner' at the Super Bowl in 1991? Houston [...] gave an emotional rendition of the song, and it remains one of her career highlights." The Oxford Students Abbas Panjwani wrote that "Houston’s version is totally euphoric and boundless in energy. Nothing overly fancy. Just immense vocal talent." Chris Willman from Yahoo! Music complimented on Houston's version of the song that it "hasn't aged" and "may remain the most highly regarded version of our lifetimes," ranked second in his 'The 10 Best National Anthems Ever' list. Mike Vaccaro of New York Post recalled the performance that "Not only because she [Houston] was at her peak that January of 1991, not only because we were at war, but she hits the final note ('brave') in a different way than almost anyone else who’s ever tried to sing it, and it is unforgettable," choosing it as his all time number-one favorite among the national anthems. Both Jack Yacks and Gary Mills of The Florida Times-Union described the song as "the gold standard for national anthem performances." In March 2011, St. Petersburg Times Tom Jones, in his article of memorable sporting events in Tampa Bay Area, recalled the Super Bowl XXV as follows: "the game was about more than football. The United States was embroiled in the first Gulf War, and Whitney Houston, right, backed by the Florida Orchestra, produced goose bumps and tears with a powerful rendition of the Star-Spangled Banner. It is one of the great Super Bowl moments."

Accolades

Chart performance 
Whitney Houston's rendition of "The Star Spangled Banner" at Super Bowl XXV was released as a single in the United States alone on February 12, 1991 during the Gulf War. The single debuted at number 32 on the Billboard Hot 100 Singles chart, the issue dated of March 9, 1991, becoming her highest first week chart entry at the time and the first rendition of the national anthem to appear on the chart since 1968, when José Feliciano's version during Game 5 pregame ceremonies of the 1968 World Series, climbed to number 50. Her previous highest debut on the chart had been when "I Wanna Dance with Somebody (Who Loves Me)" entered the Hot 100 chart some six places lower at number 38 in May 1987. The following week it leaped to number 25, two weeks later peaked at number 20 on the chart in the March 30, 1991 issue, making Houston the first and only artist to hit the Top 20 with the national anthem since 1958, when the Billboard Hot 100 chart was published first, and spent a total of 11 weeks on the chart. The single was certified Gold for shipments of 500,000 copies and the video single was 2× Platinum for shipping of 100,000 units, respectively, by the Recording Industry Association of America (RIAA) on April 11, 1991. "The Star Spangled Banner" became the fastest-selling single in Arista's history at the time, with 750,000 copies sold in the first eight days.

Thanks to re-entering the Hot 100 Airplay list at number 45 with 30 million listeners, Houston's 1991 Super Bowl version of "The Star Spangled Banner" re-visited the Billboard Hot 100 chart at number 50, with the marks for Gold certification and 12 weeks on, the issue date of September 29, 2001. It also debuted for the first time on Hot R&B/Hip-Hop Singles & Tracks chart at number 54 in the same week. On its first week of retail release, the song re-entered the Billboard Hot 100 Singles Sales chart at number two, and the following week topped the chart in the October 20 issue, becoming her third chart-topper, after "I Will Always Love You" in 1992 and "Exhale (Shoop Shoop)" in 1995. In the same week, the single reached number 13 and a peak of number 30, on the Hot 100 and Hot R&B/Hip-Hop chart, respectively. On the Billboard October 27, 2001 issue, Houston set another historic Hot 100 record with "The Star Spangled Banner" which reached number six on the chart, becoming her 23th and last top 10 hit. She became the first and only artist to make the national anthem Top 10 hit since 1958, when Billboard premiered the Hot 100 chart, and the third overall in music history, following Margaret Woodrow Wilson who hit number seven with it in 1915 and Irish tenorJohn McCormack who made the tune number one in 1917. It stayed on the chart for a total of 27 weeks, combined a fresh-16-weeks with 1991's 11 weeks. The single gave an impressive performance on the Hot 100 Singles Sales chart, spending six weeks on the top of the chart from October 20 to November 24, 2001 and 94 weeks on the chart by May 2003. In October 2001, RIAA certified it Platinum for shipments of 1,000,000 copies, making it Houston's seventh Platinum single. According to Nielsen SoundScan, as of 2007, it sold 1,200,000 copies in the US alone.

As the single was released in some countries in 1991, it failed to make the pop charts outside of the United States. In 2001, however, the single surprisingly debuted a peak of number five on the Canadian SoundScan Singles chart for the week dated November 11, 2001.

Lip-sync controversy 
In the days following Houston's performance of the national anthem at Super Bowl XXV, a controversy arose when it was reported that she lip-synched to her own pre-recorded version of the song.

Accounts of the performance vary. Bob Best, an NFL pre-game entertainment official, stated that the NFL chose to air a pre-recorded version of the song because "we felt there were too many risks to do it live." In an interview with the New York Post, Best said that what was played was "protection copy" (music recorded in advance to be used in the event of the singer's last-minute inability to sing) recorded by Houston several days before the game at an L.A. studio. In a February 4, 1991 article, Mary Jo Melone wrote: "It was the Memorex. The singing and music you heard were prerecorded."

Dan Klores, a spokesman for Houston, explained "This is not a Milli Vanilli thing; she sang, but the microphone was turned off. It was a technical decision, partially based on the noise factor. This is standard procedure at these events." In 2001, Kathryn Holm McManus, former executive director of the orchestra, told the St. Petersburg Times that "everyone was playing, and Whitney was singing, but there were no live microphones. Everyone was lip-synching or finger-synching". Rickey Minor, who was Houston's musical director in 1991, confirmed in 2012 that while Houston had sung the anthem live, the audience had heard a pre-recorded version of the song.

In slight contrast, Super Bowl engineer Larry Estrin told USA Today in 1991 that TV viewers actually heard the studio version of the song "plus her live voice, plus the audience reaction". Estrin added, "She sang the melody and words the same way (as the studio version), but she sang her heart out."

However, Houston's personal publicist, Regina Brown, said, "Our understanding is Whitney sang live into a live microphone".

Mary Jo Melone commented, "This was the nation's most precious piece of music sung by one of its best performers at a most precarious time. If we were going to make such a deal of the moment, for the troops in Saudi Arabia, we should have heard the real thing. Or at least we should have been told we weren't." Songwriter and producer Jimmy Jam, in a 2004 interview with The Associated Press, said, "Whitney, when she did the national anthem, which was the greatest national anthem that we ever heard, what we heard over the air was prerecorded. The reason it was prerecorded was, that was a moment that no one wanted any mistakes. They didn't want any feedback, they didn't want any technical difficulties ... and it was great."

In later years, when controversies arose involving lip-syncing by performers, Houston's Super Bowl performance was sometimes mentioned. When Jennifer Hudson delivered a lip-syncing of "The Star Spangled Banner" at Super Bowl XLIII in February 2009, it caused some controversy. David Hinckley of New York Daily News remarked, "The national anthem is different. Yes, it's a musical performance and yes, we're interested in how a Jennifer Hudson will interpret the song. That's why we remember the Whitney Houston and Marvin Gaye versions so well. Because the Super Bowl is primarily a television spectacle with a thousand moving parts, the producers years ago started asking to hear the anthem tracks a week before airtime, just so they would have one less potential variable. That's why [Jennifer Hudson] was lip-syncing."

Royalty dispute 
The Florida Orchestra's contribution to the performance was virtually ignored by the public and the media. That did not cause a problem until the performance was determined to release as a single and donate any proceeds to a war-related charity by Arista Records. Although Ashley Sanford, a representative of Arista in New York, said everyone associated with the performance had been consulted before announcing plans for the recording, the plan came as a surprise to the orchestra. Kathryn Holm, then acting executive director for the orchestra, told St. Petersburg Times that "We were informed indirectly. We had heard something about it. But we didn't know anything had been decided." Arranger John Clayton was surprised as well, saying "I had heard some talk something might happen." Unlike Clayton, who was paid for his work, the orchestra was paid only for its expenses. The musicians and music director Jahja Ling donated their services. According to Holm, their contract gave permission only for a single broadcast of the performance. Holm said "I'm not an expert in this, so I don't know whether the radio or television stations have permission to broadcast it or not." The orchestra's original contract with the NFL, signed December in 1990, didn't even mention subsequent releases. Holm demanded proper compensation from Arista for the contribution of the orchestra, then faced financial trouble and wanted a share of any profits from its Super Bowl performance, telling the Times that "Nobody anticipated the reaction, but part of the anthem's impact came from the arrangement behind it, so we believe our musicians deserve some restitution." Eventually, the orchestra received royalty payments in 1991 and 1992 of about $100,000, the St. Petersburg Times reported.

On December 14, 2001, the Florida Orchestra sued Arista Records for royalties from copies of the song re-released after Sept. 11 and placed on a Whitney Houston Greatest Hits album and videocassette. Leonard Stone, then orchestra executive director, said "It is a pity that we have to go to court on something so honorable and uplifting as the national anthem. [...] I suspect that Whitney Houston, if she knew, would be deeply hurt and offended as well. She was a friend of the orchestra," filing the lawsuit in Hillsborough Circuit Court asked a judge to enforce the terms of a 1991 agreement that requires Arista to pay the orchestra royalties on all sales worldwide of her rendition of "The Star-Spangled Banner." Under the agreement, the orchestra would get royalties of 5 percent on the suggested retail price of all copies of the song sold in the United States. The royalties would range from 2.5 to 4.25 percent in foreign countries. According to Stone, Arista was supposed to send the orchestra quarterly reports on the album's sales but the orchestra never received them, and no one at the orchestra knew that Houston's rendition of the song had been released in 2000 on her greatest hits album. Stone added that "the orchestra learned of the alleged contract breach after the anthem was reissued following the Sept. 11 terrorist attacks and quickly became a hot-selling single." Following the song's release after Sept. 11, orchestra attorney Frank Jakes began looking into the issue. Jakes, who negotiated the agreement with Arista in 1991, said that he sent Arista's general counsel letters and faxes but got no response, recalling how unwilling Arista had been to pay the orchestra a decade ago. However, thanks to both sides' efforts for resolution of the dispute, three days later (December 17, 2001), the suit was withdrawn by the orchestra voluntarily. The Arista spokesperson said "it was an administrative oversight from [Houston's] Greatest Hits album." An Arista representative assured Jakes who claimed that the non-profit organization had not received quarterly royalty statements since mid-1992, that the issue could be settled without legal action.

Other live performances 

Before her famous rendition of "The Star Spangled Banner" at Super Bowl XXV in 1991, Whitney Houston sang the national anthem several times in sports events, such as:
1988: Los Angeles Lakers vs. New Jersey Nets game on December 14, 1988
1990: Game 3 of the 1989-90 NBA playoffs conference finals of Chicago Bulls vs. Detroit Pistons game on May 26, 1990. 
1991: Two months after the Super Bowl performance of the song, Houston opened Welcome Home Heroes with Whitney Houston, her first-ever full-length TV concert, with "The Star Spangled Banner" at Norfolk Naval Air Station in Virginia for a crowd of about 3,200 including Desert Storm troops and their families on March 31, 1991. Houston, in an interview with The Associated Press before the concert, said that her Super Bowl performance sparked a sense of patriotism in her and made her to carry the song over into a concert. The concert was broadcast live nationally on HBO and simulcast on various US radio stations. Liz Smith of Newsday, after the controversy about Houston's lip-syncing at Super Bowl XXV, wrote that "anyone out there who still doubts Whitney's ability to vocally conquer 'The Star Spangled Banner' without technical help should tune in to HBO," praising Houston's Super Bowl performance highly as mentioned above. The performance was included in Laserdisc of the same title only, released in the United States in October 1991. (the performance was not in even LD releases of the concert in foreign countries such Germany and Japan, as well as all of VHS and DVD releases since 1991.) 
1999: Houston also gave a live performance of the national anthem at the inaugural WNBA All-Star Game at Madison Square Garden in New York, New York on July 14, 1999. George Willis of New York Post said that the performance was "nearly as stirring as when she sang before Super Bowl XXV in Tampa."

Influence 
Beyoncé, who performed "The Star-Spangled Banner" at Super Bowl XXXVIII in 2004, referred to Houston's Super Bowl anthem as a big influence on her, talking about the experience on The Oprah Winfrey Show, originally aired on April 5, 2004: "Even more so than the Grammys, singing The Star-Spangled Banner, the national anthem, has always been a dream. [As a child,] I watched Whitney Houston, and I literally was in tears. And I grew up saying, 'Mom, I'm going to do that.'...I actually did it! It was overwhelming. It was amazing, it really was."

Lady Gaga, in an exclusive interview with CNN-IBN, answered the question about her mention of Houston's name in her Grammy award acceptance speech in 2011 that "Whitney was my major vocal inspiration when I was young. We used to listen to her rendition of 'The Star Spangled Banner' over and over again. She has an angel in her throat, and I promised myself that the first time I win a Grammy that I would thank Whitney on TV. I did that last year too, but that was not on TV. So this year I had to thank her again."

Track listing and formats 

US CD single (1991 version) / US Cassette single
"The Star Spangled Banner"—2:17
"America the Beautiful"—1:32
US 7" vinyl single
A "The Star Spangled Banner"—2:15
B "America the Beautiful"—1:31

US CD single (2001 version) / EU CD single
"The Star Spangled Banner"—2:14
"America the Beautiful"—1:31

Video single / VHS
Running time – 4 minutes 30 seconds

Credits and personnel 
Credits adapted from "The Star Spangled Banner" single liner notes.

"The Star Spangled Banner"
Musical arrangement—John Clayton, Jr. featuring The Florida Orchestra conducted by Maestro Jahja Ling
Vocal arrangements—Whitney Houston

"America the Beautiful"
Rhythm arrangement inspired by Ray Charles
 Background vocals—Perri Sisters
 Vocal arrangements—Whitney Houston
 Producer—Ricky Minor and Whitney Houston

Charts and certifications

Weekly charts

Year-end charts

Certifications

References

Further reading

External links 
The Star Spangled Banner at Discogs

Whitney Houston songs
Charity singles following the September 11 attacks
1991 singles
2001 singles
The Star-Spangled Banner
History of the Super Bowl
20th century in Tampa, Florida
1990 National Football League season
Arista Records singles